Xu You may refer to:

Xu You (hermit) (許由) (fl. 23rd century BC), legendary hermit during Emperor Yao's time
Xu You (Han dynasty) (許攸) (died 204), Han dynasty strategist
Xu You (Southern Tang) (徐遊) (fl. 960), Southern Tang dynasty minister